Ilkka-Yhtymä Oyj is a Southern Ostrobothnian publishing house operating in Seinäjoki and Vaasa, Finland. It publishes two the major regional newspapers Pohjalainen and Ilkka and seven local/town newspapers. The parent company Ilkka-Yhtymä ("Ilkka Group") owns the subsidiaries I-Mediat Oy, which publishes the newspapers, I-print Oy, which is their printing house and a property management company for their facilities. Additionally, Ilkka-Yhtymä owns substantial stock in Alma Media, Arena Partners, Väli-Suomen Media and Yrittävä Suupohja. Ilkka-Yhtymä also cooperates with other regional newspapers in producing national political news and features. Its shares are listed on the Helsinki Stock Exchange; among Finnish companies, it is considered a medium-sized company. The 2015 revenue was €41.2 million and the operating profit 9.0%, with 4.8% ROI. The Group had 299 personnel.

Previously, the two newspapers Pohjalainen and Ilkka were fierce competitors. However, in 1992, then-owner Aamulehti sold Pohjalainen to Ilkka. In 2009, Vaasa Oy, the publisher of Pohjalainen, was renamed I-Mediat Oy and Ilkka and other subsidiary newspapers were merged into it. There were 94 journalists and photographers working for the newspapers at the time of the merger.

References 

Companies listed on Nasdaq Helsinki
Publishing companies of Finland